The Freeport–Roslyn Expressway (also known as the Freeport–Roslyn Express Highway) was a proposed north–south limited-access highway, that would have run between Freeport and East Hills, in the vicinity of Roslyn, on Long Island, in the State of New York. It was cancelled due to community opposition and associated highway revolts. Instead, the Meadowbrook State Parkway, which had its northern terminus on the Freeport-Merrick border, was extended to Roslyn, where it meets the Northern State Parkway.

History 
The Freeport–Roslyn Expressway was proposed in 1951, and would have been a "cross-island feeder"—or "leg"—of the Horrace Harding (Long Island) Expressway's extension to Roslyn (and eventually to Riverhead). The highway would have featured a total of 10 lanes, and had an estimated price tag of $40,000,000 (equivalent to $ in ). Though the plans were supported by Freeport's Northeast Civic Association, citing economic benefits, the expressway was quickly met with fierce community opposition, notably by the Freeport–Roslyn Expressway Protest Committee, which successfully garnered tens of thousands of signatures, as well as nearly $20,000 (equivalent to $ in ), from people that were against the expressway's construction. This led to the Freeport–Roslyn Expressway proposal being postponed by Nassau County c. March 1952, and ultimately being cancelled that October. The Meadowbrook was extended from Freeport to Roslyn instead, completed in 1956.

Route description

Southern segment: Freeport to Baldwin 
The section of the expressway between Freeport and Baldwin would have been located parallel (and adjacent) to Milburn Creek.<ref  Its southern terminus would be located at Atlantic Avenue. It would follow the creek and Brookside Avenue, traverse the former Milburn Golf Club, and go along the Baldwin side of Milburn reservoir.

In addition to running adjacent to Milburn Creek, this routing would have also straddled the school district boundaries, meaning students would not need to cross to the other side of the expressway to get to and/or from school.

Middle segment 
The middle segment would have brought the expressway through the heart of Nassau County, providing access to places such as Hempstead, Garden City, Roosevelt Field, and Mineola.

Northern segment 
The northern segment would have followed (or paralleled) the alignment of Glen Cove Road, connecting to the Long Island Expressway (its parent route) in East Hills, in the vicinity of Roslyn.

See also 

 Western Nassau Expressway (NY 101)
 Seaford-Oyster Bay Expressway (NY 135)
 Highway revolts in the United States

References 

Roads on Long Island